Joy S. Gaylin Reidenberg is an American comparative anatomist specializing in the vocal and breathing apparatus of mammals, particularly cetaceans (whales, including dolphins and porpoises). She is best known as the Comparative Anatomist in the TV science documentary series Inside Nature's Giants.  In this series, she performed dissections of the animals to demonstrate their anatomy, and explained how these adaptations function in living animals.

Education
Reidenberg became interested in animal science and art as a high school student.  She earned a bachelor's degree (B.A.) from Cornell University in 1983, a master's (M.Phil.) from the Mount Sinai School of Medicine Graduate Program in Biological Sciences in 1985, and a doctorate (Ph.D.) in Biomedical Sciences: Anatomy in 1988.  There, she worked with anthropologist Jeffrey Laitman.

Career

Media
In 2009, a British production company approached her about coming to Ireland on short notice to help dissect a 19.8 m (65 ft) fin whale that had washed up on the south coast. She conducted the dissection, and the company was so happy with her performance that they asked her to become a regular contributor to Inside Nature's Giants, dissecting a variety of animals (18 episodes in total), including: fin whale, sperm whale, lion, tiger, elephant, giraffe, hippo, crocodile, python, great white shark, giant squid, camel, kangaroo, cassowary, baboon, leatherback sea turtle, polar bear, race horse, giant jungle insects.  She also starred in the 4-episode series "Sex in the Wild" (on PBS in the USA), also known as "Born in the Wild" (on Channel 4 in the UK), about animal reproduction in elephants, orangutans (and other primates), dolphins (and other whales), and kangaroos (and other marsupials).  She was also featured in a 3-day live series called "Big Blue Live" on PBS about marine life in Monterey Bay, California.

Academic
Reidenberg works in New York City and is a professor at the Icahn School of Medicine at Mount Sinai's Center for Anatomy and Functional Morphology, where she teaches in the Structures Course (Gross Anatomy, Histology, Embryology, and Imaging).  She was also the Course Director for General Anatomy at the New York College of Podiatric Medicine.

References

External links
 
 Joy Reidenberg's university homepage
 Joy Reidenberg at The New York Consortium in Evolutionary Primatology

Living people
American anatomists
American women biologists
1962 births
Cornell University alumni
21st-century American women scientists
21st-century American biologists
Women anatomists
Icahn School of Medicine at Mount Sinai alumni
Icahn School of Medicine at Mount Sinai faculty